Carrousel is the fourth album of Enanitos Verdes published in 1988. The production of the disc was again headed by Andres Calamaro. It featured three new hit songs, "Guitarras blancas", "No me veras", and "Sos un perdedor".

Track listing 

 "Sos un perdedor" [You're A Loser]
 "Guitarras blancas" [White Guitars]
 "No me verás" [You Will Not See Me]
 "Un día bien" [One Day Right]
 "Vengo de última" [I Come Last]
 "Soy un espejo" [I'm A Mirror]
 "De hoy en más" [Today In Most]
 "Alrededor de mí" [Around Me]
 "Que hacer conmigo" [What To Do With Me]

References 
 

1988 albums
Enanitos Verdes albums